Protease activated receptor 3 (PAR-3) also known as coagulation factor II receptor-like 2 (F2RL2) and thrombin receptor-like 2, is a protein that in humans is encoded by the F2RL2 gene.

Function 

Coagulation factor II (thrombin) receptor-like 2 (F2RL2) is a member of the large family of 7-transmembrane receptors that couple to G proteins. F2RL2 is also a member of the protease-activated receptor family and activated by thrombin. F2RL2 is activated by proteolytic cleavage of its extracellular amino terminus. The new amino terminus functions as a tethered ligand and activates the receptor. F2RL2 is a cofactor for F2RL3 activation by thrombin. It mediates thrombin-triggered phosphoinositide hydrolysis and is expressed in a variety of tissues.

See also
 Protease-activated receptor

References

Further reading

G protein-coupled receptors